Krisztián Péter Manhercz (born 6 February 1997) is a Hungarian male water polo player, playing at the wing position. He is part of the Hungary men's national water polo team. He competed at the 2016 Men's European Water Polo Championship and 2016 Olympics. He won bronze at the 2020 Olympics.

Honours

National
 World Championships:  Silver medal - 2017
 European Championship:  Bronze medal - 2016
 FINA Water Polo World League:  Silver medal - 2018
 FINA World Cup:  Gold medal - 2018
 Junior World Championship: (Bronze medal - 2015)
 Junior European Championship: (Silver medal - 2014)
 Youth World Championship: (Gold medal - 2014, Silver medal - 2012)

Club
 LEN Euro Cup Winner (1): (2018 - with Ferencváros)
 Hungarian Championship (OB I): 1x (2018 - with Ferencváros)

Awards
 Szalay Iván díj (2013)
 All-Star Team of the Junior World Championship: 2014

See also
 Hungary men's Olympic water polo team records and statistics
 List of World Aquatics Championships medalists in water polo

References

External links

 

1997 births
Living people
Hungarian male water polo players
Water polo players at the 2016 Summer Olympics
Place of birth missing (living people)
World Aquatics Championships medalists in water polo
Water polo players at the 2020 Summer Olympics
Medalists at the 2020 Summer Olympics
Olympic bronze medalists for Hungary in water polo
21st-century Hungarian people